Jerzy Bardziński (23 November 1892 – 26 October 1933) was a Polish bobsledder. He competed in the four-man event at the 1928 Winter Olympics.

Bardziński was a cavalry officer in the Polish Army. He fought in the Polish-Soviet War. For his actions he was later awarded the Silver Cross of the Virtuti Militari, Officer's Cross of the Order of Polonia Restituta and the Cross of Valour.

References

1892 births
1933 deaths
Polish male bobsledders
Polish military officers
Olympic bobsledders of Poland
Bobsledders at the 1928 Winter Olympics
People from Gostynin County
Sportspeople from Masovian Voivodeship
Polish people of the Polish–Soviet War
Recipients of the Silver Cross of the Virtuti Militari
Officers of the Order of Polonia Restituta
Recipients of the Cross of Valour (Poland)
Polish military attachés